All Smiles is an album by the Kenny Clarke/Francy Boland Big Band featuring performances recorded in Germany in 1968 and released on the MPS label. The album was also released in the US on Prestige Records as Let's Face the Music.

Reception

The AllMusic review says "One of the qualities that set apart this aggregation from others of the same mettle was the smoothness of the playing. Smoothness here means sensuous and bluesy, not lifeless in the sense the term is used in contemporary jazz. There's a bounce to the up-tempo tunes, but the ostentatious playing other bands were noted for is shunned. A fine performance".

Track listing
 "Let's Face the Music and Dance" (Irving Berlin) – 3:23
 "I'm All Smiles" (Michael Leonard, Herbert Martin) – 3:25
 "You Stepped Out of a Dream" (Nacio Herb Brown, Gus Kahn) – 3:03
 "I'm Glad There Is You" (Jimmy Dorsey, Paul Madeira) – 3:29
 "Get Out of Town" (Cole Porter) – 4:47
 "By Strauss" (George Gershwin, Ira Gershwin) – 3:35
 "When Your Lover Has Gone" (Einar Aaron Swan) – 4:16
 "Gloria's Theme (from "Butterfield Eight")" (Bronisław Kaper, David Mack) – 4:21
 "Sweet and Lovely" (Gus Arnheim, Jules LeMare, Harry Tobias) – 3:36
 "High School Cadets" (John Philip Sousa) – 2:05

Personnel 
Kenny Clarke – drums
Francy Boland – piano, arranger
Benny Bailey, Jimmy Deuchar,  Sonny Grey, Idrees Sulieman – trumpet
Nat Peck, Åke Persson, Eric van Lier – trombone
Derek Humble – alto saxophone 
Johnny Griffin, Ronnie Scott, Tony Coe – tenor saxophone
Sahib Shihab – baritone saxophone, flute
Jimmy Woode – bass
Dave Pike – vibraphone
Kenny Clare – drums

References 

1968 albums
Kenny Clarke/Francy Boland Big Band albums
MPS Records albums
Prestige Records albums